Edwin Bell Forsythe (January 17, 1916 – March 29, 1984) was an American Republican Party politician from New Jersey who represented parts of Burlington, Ocean, and Camden Counties in the United States House of Representatives from 1970 until his death from lung cancer in 1984.

Biography
Forsythe was born in Westtown, Pennsylvania on January 17, 1916, and attended the local public schools. He served as secretary on the Moorestown Township, New Jersey Board of Adjustment from 1948 to 1952, was a member of the Moorestown Committee from 1953 to 1962, serving as Mayor of Moorestown, New Jersey from 1957 to 1962, and was chairman of the Moorestown Planning Board from 1962 to 1963. He was a member of the executive board of the New Jersey State League of Municipalities from 1958 to 1962. Forsythe was elected to the New Jersey Senate, where he served from 1964 to 1970. He was a delegate to the New Jersey Constitutional convention in 1966 and selected as a delegate to the 1968 Republican National Convention.

Forsythe was elected simultaneously as a Republican to the 91st and to the 92nd Congress by special election to fill the vacancy caused by the resignation of United States Representative William T. Cahill to become Governor of New Jersey, and reelected to the seven succeeding Congresses (November 3, 1970 – March 29, 1984). Forsythe represented New Jersey's 6th congressional district until 1983. In redistricting following the 1980 United States census, Forsythe was shifted to New Jersey's 13th congressional district, where he was elected for a single term in office.

Forsythe died at the age of 68 at his home in Moorestown Township on March 29, 1984, due to lung cancer. His remains were cremated and his ashes interred at Union Street Friends Cemetery, Medford, New Jersey.

Legacy
The Edwin B. Forsythe National Wildlife Refuge is named in his honor.

See also
 List of United States Congress members who died in office (1950–99)

References

External links

1916 births
1984 deaths
Deaths from cancer in New Jersey
Deaths from lung cancer
Republican Party New Jersey state senators
Politicians from Burlington County, New Jersey
Presidents of the New Jersey Senate
Republican Party members of the United States House of Representatives from New Jersey
Westtown School alumni
20th-century American politicians
Mayors of Moorestown, New Jersey